Irene Tripod was a British actress of the silent era.

Selected filmography
 The Romance of Lady Hamilton (1919)
 The Mystery Road (1921)
 The House of Peril (1922)
 Dicky Monteith (1922)
 The Beloved Vagabond (1923)
 Squibs' Honeymoon (1923)
 Squibs M.P. (1923)
 White Slippers (1924)
 A Friend of Cupid (1925)
 A Fowl Proceeding (1925)
 The Maid at the Palace (1927)
 The Feather (1929)

References

External links

Year of birth unknown
Year of death unknown
British film actresses
English film actresses
English silent film actresses
Actresses from London
20th-century English actresses